Selyanka is a rural locality (a khutor) in Romashkovksoye Rural Settlement, Pallasovsky District, Volgograd Oblast, Russia. The population was 40 as of 2010. There are 2 streets.

Geography 
Selyanka is located on the Caspian Depression, 27 km northwest of Pallasovka (the district's administrative centre) by road. Zavolzhsky is the nearest rural locality.

References 

Rural localities in Pallasovsky District